Kolachi  was also a port located at modern Karachi and the old name of Karachi, Sindh, Pakistan. According to legends, it was a port developed when an old fisherwoman by the name of Mai Kolachi settled near the delta of the Indus River to start a community. One of the main Flyover (overpass) in Karachi has been named after Mai Kolachi. This settlement was also known as "Kolachi jo Goth" or "the village of the Kolachi".

See also 
 Dubai
 Kulachi (tribe)
 Kolachi jo Goth
 Krokola
 Karachi
 Mai Kolachi
 Debal
 Bhambore

References

Former populated places in Pakistan
History of Sindh
History of Karachi